Foelgastell is a village and community in the county of Carmarthenshire, west Wales. The  village has seen much new building of comparatively expensive housing over the past two decades and is within the electoral ward of Gorslas to the west of the social housing area of Cefneithin.

Villages in Carmarthenshire